IAU (IAU); French: Institut Américain Universitaire, is an American institution of higher learning located in southern France that offers study abroad opportunities in various fields.  Its main campus is in Aix-en-Provence, France, and offers satellite programs throughout Spain, Morocco, and the United Kingdom. Established in 1957, IAU was one of the first American-style, English language, liberal arts educational institutions in Western Europe. It is chartered by the Regents of the State University of New York and is recognized by the Rectorat of Aix-Marseille University and by the French Ministry of Education as a private higher education institution. IAU is often considered the oldest and largest study abroad program in Europe and the first institution to offer a study abroad program to those studying programs other than French language. In 2015, IAU began offering master's and bachelor's degree-granting programs through its sister institution, the American College of the Mediterranean (ACM).

History

IAU was founded in 1957 by academics and former diplomats such as Dr. Herbert Maza, who also served as its first President., Dr. Evron Kirkpatrick, Ambassador Jeane Kirkpatrick, and others who wanted to provide a platform for Americans interested in studying diplomatic relations with related interests and careers in the foreign service and the State Department.  It was founded under the authority of Aix-Marseille University and offered a study abroad program, providing for transfer credit to those willing to live and study in France for one year. With its inception, it became the first institution to offer study abroad programs to students with majors other than language.

By 1966 the Institute had an enrollment of approximately 150 students and in 1984 it incorporated the Leo Marchutz School of Painting & Drawing (founded by Leo Marchutz in 1972) into its offerings. The program grew and as of 2015 has served more than 700 colleges and universities with over 20,000 undergraduates, and an annual enrollment of over 700.

Programs and locations

IAU's main campus is located in Aix-en-Provence in the southern region of France where its programs of study are provided in French and English. The Aix campus is home to IAU's School of Humanities and Social Sciences, the Marchutz School of Fine Arts, the School of Business and International Relations, and the 'Centre d'Etudes Françaises'. Its Paris campus is located at the Université de Paris-Sorbonne and provides French language studies. IAU also hosts semester and summer programs in Barcelona, Spain for students interested in Spanish language and cultural courses. IAU also conducts unique traveling seminar programs during the January term/Intersession where students visit numerous countries throughout their studies including France, Morocco, Spain, Greece, Italy, The Czech Republic, and England.

IAU owns all of its properties in Aix-en-Provence, including Manning Hall, the main academic building which houses offices, classroom space, a library and student leisure space, The Center for French Studies (Centre d’Etudes Francaises or CEF) which houses all courses taught in French, a computer lab and a library dedicated to Francophone studies, the Marchutz Studio, and faculty housing for Resident Fellows and visiting scholars.

Accreditation and affiliations

IAU was founded in 1957 and is chartered by the Regents of the State University of New York and is recognized by the Rectorat of Aix-Marseille University and by the French Ministry of Education as a private higher education institution. IAU is registered in the United States as a 501(c)(3) not-for-profit organization.  It is one of the founding members of the Association of American International Colleges and Universities (AAICU), a national charter member of the Forum on Education Abroad, and members of the National Association of Foreign Student Admission (NAFSA), the College Consortium for International Studies (CCIS), and the Association of International Education Administrators (AIEA).
 
IAU has partnerships with two U.S. accredited institutions, Northern Illinois University and Fairfield University, where either institution will provide their transcript for coursework done at IAU. IAU's business courses are approved by Fairfield University and Northern Illinois University, each of whom have business schools that are top-ranked and accredited by The Association to Advance Collegiate Schools of Business (AACSB).

Faculty and governance

IAU is governed by a private, autonomous Board of Trustees and offers programs leading to bachelor's and master's degrees, and also provides an array of study abroad experiences year-round for students from over 250 partner universities from around the United States, including notable private institutions such as Harvard University, Cornell University, Tufts University, Rice University, and Boston College and large state universities such as University of Texas at Austin, Penn State University, University of Arizona, University of Illinois at Urbana-Champaign and many others. IAU's faculty, adjunct teaching staff and visiting lecturers are internationally diverse and include academics, business professionals, diplomats, journalists, writers and others from the United States, France and other countries.

Student body

IAU enrolls students for each semester (summer, spring and fall and January Term) and Customized Faculty Led programming. Students are primarily enrolled at American institutions, coming to IAU to study abroad.

The active student body participate in local businesses through internships as well as lecture series, social events and classroom excursions in collaboration with the neighboring Institut d’Etudes Politiques (Sciences Po- Aix) and the Institut Universitaire Technologique (IUT) of Aix-en-Provence.

Notable people
 Philip Breeden, Diplomat and professor of international relations at IAU 
 Frances D. Cook, IAU alumna, former IAU Trustee, and former U.S. Ambassador to Burundi, Cameroon, and Oman
 William Granara, Author and visiting scholar.
 Aboubakr Jamaï, Moroccan journalist and professor of international relations at IAU
 Max Kampelman, diplomat and former IAU Trustee.
 Jeane Kirkpatrick, former IAU Trustee and first woman to serve as the United States Ambassador to the United Nations 
 Kurt Volker, IAU Trustee, former United States Ambassador to NATO, and former U.S. Special Representative for Ukraine Negotiations
 Greg Wyatt, IAU Trustee and artist

References

External links
 Official  IAU website

Aix-Marseille University
Study abroad programs
Universities and colleges in Aix-en-Provence
Educational institutions established in 1957
1957 establishments in France